The Plinkaigalis Lake (also Minaga) is a lake in Krakės Eldership, Kėdainiai District Municipality, central Lithuania. It belongs to the Šušvė basin (part of the Nevėžis basin).

Coasts of the lake are high, covered by meadows. Nearby the Plinkaigalis Hillfort is located. The lake is inside Pašušvys Landscape Sanctuary.

The name comes from the village name Plinkaigalis. The name Minaga means 'lampern'.

References

Lakes of Kėdainiai District Municipality